VA-168 has the following meanings:
Attack Squadron 168 (U.S. Navy)
State Route 168 (Virginia)